Beenleigh, Queensland is a town in Australia. Beenleigh may also refer to:

 Beenleigh Rum, a brand of Australian rum
 Shire of Beenleigh, a former local government area
 Beenleigh railway line, running between Brisband and Beenleigh
 Beenleigh State High School, Beenleigh, Queensland